Inese Tarvida (born November 16, 1998) is a Latvian taekwondo athlete who represents Latvia. She won the bronze medal at the 2017 World Taekwondo Championships in the Women's bantamweight category.

In 2019, she represented Latvia at the 2019 Summer Universiade in Naples, Italy and she won one of the bronze medals in the women's 53 kg event.

References

1998 births
Living people
People from Bauska
Latvian female taekwondo practitioners
World Taekwondo Championships medalists
Medalists at the 2019 Summer Universiade
Universiade medalists in taekwondo
Universiade bronze medalists for Latvia
European Taekwondo Championships medalists
21st-century Latvian women